Mineo was one of the only four witnessed fall pallasite meteorites in the world, and the only one from Italy.

History
On May 3, 1826, a bright meteor was observed over Sicily. Near the small town of Mineo (CT) was seen the fall of an object, followed by a loud sound. From the small crater was recovered a metallic mass.

Specimens
Only 42g from this fall are still preserved in collections.

Notes

See also 
 Glossary of meteoritics
 Meteorite

External links 
 Meteoritical Bulletin Database

Meteorites found in Italy
Sicily
1826 in Italy
1826 in science
Geology of Italy
May 1826 events